Spann is a surname. Notable people with the surname include:

 Alexi Spann, American breaststroke swimmer
 Antwain Spann, American football player
 Gloria Carter Spann, sister of former American president Jimmy Carter
 James Spann, American meteorologist
 Johnny Micheal Spann, Central Intelligence Agency paramilitary operations officer
 Othmar Spann, Austrian philosopher
 Otis Spann, American blues musician
 Pervis Spann, American radio broadcaster
 Scott Spann (swimmer), American swimmer
 Silvio Spann, Trinidad and Tobagonian footballer
Antoine Spann, American Podcaster and social commentator

fi:Panni